The 2003 Trophée des Champions was a football match held at Stade de Gerland, Lyon on 26 July 2003, that saw 2002–03 Ligue 1 champions Olympique Lyonnais defeat 2003 Coupe de France winners AJ Auxerre 2–1.

Match details

See also
2003–04 Ligue 1

2003–04 in French football
2003
AJ Auxerre matches
Olympique Lyonnais matches
July 2003 sports events in Europe
Sports competitions in Lyon